Badaman may refer to:
 Badaman, Kerman
 Badaman, Kohgiluyeh and Boyer-Ahmad